Odisho is a masculine given name of Classical Syriac and Neo-Aramaic origin.

Given name
Odisho Oraham, bishop of the Assyrian Church of the East in Scandinavia and Germany

Surname
Michael Odisho, Australian gang figure
Ayoub Odisho, Iraqi footballer
Tiras Odisho, martial artist of Iraqi-Assyrian origin
Ashoor Audisho, an Assyrian-Australian who was murdered by members of the gang The Last Hour

See also
Abdisho (disambiguation), the Classical Syriac form of the name

References